Prince Moulay Ali (1924–1988) was a member of the reigning Alaouite dynasty of Morocco.

He held many senior positions including ambassador to France (1964–1966), CEO of ONA Group (1980–1985), President of Cosumar and CEO of banks such as Banque Marocaine pour l’Expansion Economique and Soc de Banque et de Crédit.

Family

He was the son of Prince Moulay Idriss (son of Sultan Moulay Youssef) and Lalla Joumala, a daughter of Moulay Mustafa by his wife which was a daughter of Sultan Hassan I. Thus was a cousin of Hassan II both on his father's and mother's side. He studied in Lycée Lyautey in Casablanca.

He was Special Adviser to his cousin King Hassan II and Special Envoy to Iran in 1966.

On 16 August 1961 he married his cousin Princess Lalla Fatima Zohra, an older sister of Hassan II, with whom he had a daughter and two sons:

Princess Lalla Joumala Alaoui (b. 1962).
Sharif Moulay Abdallah Alaoui (born c. 1965).
Sharif Moulay Youssef Alaoui (born c. 1969).

Honours
 Grand Officer of the Order of the Throne (Kingdom of Morocco).
 Grand Officer of the Order of the Legion of Honor (French Republic, 06/1963).
 Grand Officer of the Order of the Equatorial Star of Gabon.

References

1924 births
1988 deaths
Moroccan princes
'Alawi dynasty
People from Marrakesh
Ambassadors of Morocco to France
Alumni of Lycée Lyautey (Casablanca)
Moroccan chief executives
20th-century Moroccan businesspeople
Moroccan exiles in Madagascar
Moroccan bankers
Grand Officiers of the Légion d'honneur